Tang is a pinyin romanization of various Chinese surnames.

Background
Chinese surnames commonly romanized as "Tang" include Táng (唐) and Tāng (湯/汤). Tang is also occasionally used to romanize Deng (鄧/邓, Pinyin: Dèng) and Teng (滕, Pinyin: Téng), especially for persons of Hong Kong origin, based on Cantonese pronunciation. Tang can also be used to romanize the surname Zeng/Tsang (曾, Pinyin: Zēng), based on Vietnamese pronunciation.

In 2019, Táng was the 25th most common surname in Mainland China. According to a 2013 study, it was the 25th most-common name, shared by 9,170,000 people or 0.690% of the population, with the province with the most being Hunan.

People
Notable people with their surname commonly romanized as Tang include:

Western name order
People in this section have Wikipedia articles with their given name first.
 Andrew Tang (born 1999), American chess grandmaster
 Audrey Tang (born 1981), Taiwanese free-software programmer 
 Chen Tang, Japanese-born Chinese-American actor
 Ching Wan Tang (born 1947), Hong Kong–American physical chemist
 Chris Tang (born 1965), Hong Kong law enforcement administrator
 Cyndi Tang-Loveland, American animation director
 Dominic Tang (1908–1995), Chinese Jesuit priest
 Donald Tang, Shanghai-born American businessperson
 Ewin Tang (born 2000), computer scientist at the University of Washington
 Felicia Tang (1977–2009), stage name of an American actress and model
 Gordon Tang, also known as Yigang Tang, Singaporean billionaire businessperson
 Henry Tang (born 1952), Hong Kong politician
 Joyce Tang (born 1976), Hong Kong-born television actress
 Kaiji Tang (born 1984), Chinese voice actor working primarily in Los Angeles
 Melissa Tang (born 1985), American actress
 Paul Tang (civil servant) (born 1956), Hong Kong civil servant
 Paul Tang (politician) (born 1967), Dutch politician
 Roy Tang (born 1963), Hong Kong government official
 Sheren Tang (born 1966), Hong Kong actress
 Stephy Tang (born 1983), Hong Kong singer and actress
 Tiffany Tang (born 1983), Chinese actress and singer

Eastern name order
People in this section have Wikipedia articles with their family name first.
 Tang Aijun (born 1950), Chinese politician from Inner Mongolia
 Tang Baiqiao (born 1967), Chinese political dissident
 Tang Chun-i (1909–1978), Chinese philosopher
 Tang Dengjie (born 1964), Chinese politician and business executive
 Tang Erho (1878–1940), Chinese medical doctor and politician
 Tang Fei (born 1932), Republic of China air force general
 Tang Guangfu (born 1966), Chinese engineer
 Tang Hon Sing (born 1977), Hong Kong former sprinter
 Tang I-Fang (1924–2013), China-born Singaporean public servant
 Tang Jiali (footballer) (born 1995), Chinese professional footballer
 Tang Jiali (model) (born 1976), Chinese dancer and model
 Tang Jinhua (born 1992), Chinese badminton player
 Tang Jun-sang, South Korean-born Malaysian actor
 Tang Kai (born 1996), Chinese mixed martial artist
 Tang Lin (born 1976), Chinese judoka
 Tang Min (born 1971), Chinese-born tennis player
 Tang Na (1914–1988), Chinese writer
 Tang Renjian (born 1962), Chinese politician
 Tang Shaoyi (1862–1938), Chinese statesman
 Tang Tian (footballer) (born 1977), Chinese footballer and coach
 Tang Tian (songwriter) (born 1983), Chinese songwriter
 Tang Wei (born 1979), Chinese actress
 Tang Xiyang (1930–2022), Chinese environmentalist
 Tang Yi (born 1993), Chinese competitive swimmer
 Tang Yijie (1927–2014), Chinese scholar and professor
 Tang Yijun (born 1961), Chinese politician
 Tang Yin (1470–1524), Chinese painter, calligrapher, and poet
 Tang Yuanting (born 1994), Chinese badminton player
 Tang Zi (fl. 225–262), military general in China

See also

Tsang (surname)

References